The Elite League, often referred to as GFF Elite League is the top level of the football system in Guyana. Contested by 10 clubs, it operates on a system of promotion and relegation. Top level before GFF Elite League was GFF National Super League.

The competition was formed as the Stag Elite League in 2015 following a hiatus for the 2014-15 season. Its inaugural season consisted of 8 of the 11 FIFA licensed teams from Guyana. The league expanded to 10 teams for its second season, but four teams pulled out before the season began.

Teams

Champions
2015–16: Slingerz
2016–17: Guyana Defence Force
2017–18: Fruta Conquerors
2019: Fruta Conquerors

Performance by club (GFF Elite League and GFF National Super League)

References

External links
Federation Site
League at FIFA
League at soccerway.com
Guyana – List of Champions, RSSSF.com

 
1
Top level football leagues in the Caribbean
2015 establishments in Guyana
Sports leagues established in 2015